A list of films produced in France in 1933:

See also
 1933 in France

References

External links
 French films of 1933 at the Internet Movie Database
French films of 1933 at Cinema-francais.fr

1933
Films
Lists of 1933 films by country or language